Eva & Adele are an artistic couple who claim to have "landed their time machines" in Berlin after the Wall fell in 1989, claiming to be "hermaphrodite twins from the future". Both refuse to tell their real name or age. They are famous mainly for sharing an invented gender, which is neither male nor female. 

They are also known for their performance art, they have been represented by an art gallery since 1997, as they make paintings, video art, photography and costume design. They also have their own perfume line and a watch with Swatch.

Eva & Adele are known to  dress identically to each other in matching makeup, bald heads and ladylike outfits. They are known for promoting trans visibility and take selfies with many fans as part of their art project entitled "Wherever we are is museum." 

They have been recognized as the world's longest running performance art duo and are often photographed as fashion icons at art events, like Art Basel Miami Beach and the Venice Biennale.

History 

The duo claim that since they met they have vowed never to spend a night apart, nor receive guests in their house, without being fully madeup. They were married in 2011, after a three year battle to get Eva's sex listed as female on her birth certificate. 

Eva (who is taller) argued to the court that although her body was a man, her soul was not. After reading numerous psychiatric and psychological reports, the judge agreed. Eva's birth certificate was then reissued with her sex as female.

They are on many "best dressed" lists. In 2015, they created their own watch with Swatch which was released during the Venice Biennale.

Their philosophy is called "Futuring," a belief that your thoughts create the future, similari to The Secret.

Artwork 
In 2018, the duo had a 20 year retrospective featuring their Polaroid photos, paintings, drawings, art installations and costume design work at the Me Collectors Room, a museum in Berlin, Germany. They also had a retrospective at the Musee d'Art Moderne Paris in Paris, France in 2016.

Their artwork has been called campy and the duo have been described as stalwarts of the Berlin art scene. They are known  for looking like "a weird couple."

In the Media

From 1997 to 2002 Eva & Adele made appearances in the Channel 4 show Eurotrash as 'The Eggheads.' They have been interviewed by many YouTubers and local European TV stations. Many photos of Eva & Adele can be found on photo agency websites like Getty Images and Shutterstock.

References

External links 

 Eva & Adele on Artsy
 Eva & Adele on Artnet
 Eva & Adele official website
 Eva & Adele watch with Swatch
 Eva & Adele on Instagram
 Eva & Adele on YouTube
 Eva & Adele artworks on Nicole Gnesa Gallery 
 Eva & Adele books with Abe Books Publishing House

German performance artists
Art duos